Argentina is scheduled to compete at the 2023 Pan American Games in Santiago, Chile from October 20 to November 5, 2023. This was Argentina's 19th appearance at the Pan American Games, having competed at every edition of the games since the inaugural edition in 1951.

Competitors
The following is the list of number of competitors (per gender) participating at the games per sport/discipline.

Archery

Argentina qualified a male archer in individual compound by winning the 2022 South American Games. Argentina also qualified a male archer in individual recurve during the 2022 Pan American Archery Championships.

Men

Artistic swimming

Argentina qualified a team of two artistic swimmers at the 2022 South American Games.

Basketball

5x5

Men's tournament

Argentina qualified a men's team (of 12 athletes) by winning the 2022 FIBA Americup.

Summary

Basque pelota 

Argentina qualified a team of 4 athletes (two men and two women) through the 2022 Basque Pelota World Championship in Biarritz, France.
 Men

 Women

Boxing

Argentina qualified two boxers (one man and one woman) by reaching the final of the 2022 South American Games.

Men

Women

Canoeing

Sprint
Argentina qualified a total of 16 sprint athletes (eight men and eight women).

Men

Women

Cycling

BMX
Argentina qualified a female cyclist in BMX race after winning the event in the 2021 Junior Pan American Games and two male cyclists in BMX race through the UCI World Rankings.

Racing

Track
Argentina qualified a team of 3 male cyclists (3 men and 1 women) after winning the respective events at the 2022 South American Games.

Madison

Omnium

Equestrian

Argentina qualified a full team of 12 equestrians (four in Dressage, Eventing and Jumping).

Dressage

Eventing

Jumping

Fencing

Argentina qualified a full team of 18 fencers (nine men and nine women), after all six teams finished at least in the top seven at the 2022 Pan American Fencing Championships in Ascuncion, Paraguay. Dante Cerquetti and Candela Espinosa Veloso also qualified after each winning a gold medal at the 2021 Junior Pan American Games in Cali, Colombia. This mean the team size was 20 fencers (ten per gender).

Individual
Men

Women

Team

Field hockey

Men's tournament

Argentina qualified a men's team (of 16 athletes) by winning the 2022 South American Games.

Summary

Women's tournament

Argentina qualified a women's team (of 16 athletes) by finishing second in the 2022 South American Games.

Summary

Football

Women's tournament

Argentina qualified a women's team of 18 athletes after finishing third at the 2022 Copa América Femenina in Colombia.

Summary

Handball

Men's tournament

Argentina qualified a men's team (of 14 athletes) by winning the 2022 South American Games.

Summary

Women's tournament

Argentina qualified a women's team (of 14 athletes) by winning the 2021 Junior Pan American Games.

Summary

Judo

Argentina has qualified one male judoka after winning the category at the 2021 Junior Pan American Games.

Men

Karate

Argentina qualified a team of 6 karatekas (three men and three women) at the 2022 South American Games.

Kumite 

Kata

Modern pentathlon

Argentina qualified six modern pentathletes (three men and three women).

Roller sports

Figure
Argentina qualified a team of two athletes in figure skating (one man and one woman).

Rugby sevens

Argentina qualified a men's team (of 12 athletes) after winning the 2022 South American Games.

Summary

Sailing

Argentina has qualified 6 boats for a total of 10 sailors.

Men

Women

Mixed

Shooting

Argentina qualified a total of 10 shooters in the 2022 Americas Shooting Championships. Argentina also qualified four shooters during the 2022 South American Games.

Men
Pistol and rifle

Shotgun

Women
Pistol and rifle

Squash

Argentina qualified a male team of 3 athletes through the 2022 South American Games.

Men

Surfing

Argentina qualified two surfers (one man and one woman).

Artistic

Race

Table tennis

Argentina qualified one extra athlete after winning the individual event of the 2021 Junior Pan American Games Argentina qualified a full team of six athletes (three men and three women) through the 2022 South American Games.

Men

Women

Mixed

Tennis

Argentina qualified one male athlete after winning the singles tournament in the 2022 South American Games. Argentina also qualified a female athlete after winning the singles tournament in the 2021 Junior Pan American Games.

Men

Women

Volleyball

Indoor

Men's tournament

Argentina qualified a men's team (of 12 athletes) by finishing second in the CSV Qualifying Tournament.

Summary

Women's tournament

Argentina qualified a women's team (of 12 athletes) by winning the CSV Qualifying Tournament.

Summary

Water polo

Men's tournament

Argentina qualified a men's team (of 11 athletes) by finishing second in the 2022 South American Games.

Summary

Women's tournament

Argentina qualified a women's team (of 11 athletes) by finishing second in the 2022 South American Games.

Summary

Water skiing

Argentina qualified two wakeboarders (one of each gender) during the 2022 Pan American Championship.

Argentina also qualified four water skiers during the 2022 Pan American Water skiing Championship.

Men

Women

Wakeboard
Men

Women

Wrestling

Argentina qualified three wrestlers (Men's Freestyle: 65 kg and 125 kg), (Women's Freestyle: 50 kg) through the 2022 Pan American Wrestling Championships held in Acapulco, Mexico.

Men

Women

See also
Argentina at the 2024 Summer Olympics

References

Nations at the 2023 Pan American Games
2023
2023 in Argentine sport